The Dahsyatnya Awards are annual awards presented by the daily Indonesian TV show Dahsyat that airs on RCTI. The show first was held on April 19, 2009.

Categories
The category in every year sometimes removed and held again as usual. The categories has been based on the voting of the jury and SMS. In 2014, this category is presented with by social media. This is categories of Dahsyatnya Awards:

Jury
 Outstanding Video Clip
 Outstanding Most Diligently Perform Guest Star
 Outstanding Role in Video Clip
 Outstanding Video Clip Director

SMS
 Outstanding Song
 Outstanding Male Solo Singer
 Outstanding Female Solo Singer
 Outstanding Newcomer
 Outstanding Band
 Outstanding Duo/Group Singer
 Outstanding Duet/Collaboration
 Outstanding Guest Host
 Outstanding Child Artist
 Outstanding Guest Star
 Outstanding Dangdut Singer
 Outstanding Moment
 Outstanding EDM

Social media
 Outstanding Couple
 Outstanding Guest Star

Retired categories
 Outstanding Stage Act
 Outstanding Most Committed Guest Star
 Outstanding Solo Singer
 Outstanding Location
 Outstanding Non-singer Guest Star
 Outstanding Figure
 Outstanding Narcissistic
 Outstanding Legend
 Outstanding Partner
 Outstanding Boyband
 Outstanding Girlband
 Outstanding Boyband/Girlband
 Outstanding Enormity of Indonesia
 Outstanding Collaboration Duo/Group
 Outstanding City
 Outstanding Spectators/Community
 Outstanding Choreographer
 Outstanding Hottest Artist
 Outstanding Birthday
 Outstanding Dance

Host cities

List of ceremonies
 2009 Dahsyatnya Awards
 2010 Dahsyatnya Awards
 2011 Dahsyatnya Awards
 2012 Dahsyatnya Awards
 2013 Dahsyatnya Awards
 2014 Dahsyatnya Awards
 2015 Dahsyatnya Awards
 2016 Dahsyatnya Awards
 2017 Dahsyatnya Awards
 2018 Dahsyatnya Awards

See also

 List of Asian television awards
 Music of Indonesia

References

External links
 
 Official sites 

 
Indonesian television awards
Awards established in 2009
Annual television shows
RCTI original programming